Social Democracy and Progress (SDP) is a social-democratic political party in Andorra led by Víctor Naudi.

History
Established in May 2013, the PSD ran in the 2015 parliamentary elections. In the constituency elections the party received 9% of the vote and failed to win a seat. However, it also received 11% of the proportional representation vote, winning two seats. It lost both those seats in the 2019 elections.

References

External links

2013 establishments in Andorra
Political parties established in 2013
Political parties in Andorra
Social democratic parties in Europe
Socialism in Andorra